Ilona Isaacson Bell is an American academic.

She taught at Williams College as Samuel Fessenden Clarke Professor of English and is married to Robert Huntley Bell.

References

Living people
Williams College faculty
Year of birth missing (living people)